Iburikawa Dam  is a gravity dam located in Kochi Prefecture in Japan. The dam is used for flood control and water supply. The catchment area of the dam is 0.7 km2. The dam impounds about 4  ha of land when full and can store 352 thousand cubic meters of water. The construction of the dam was started on 1989 and completed in 2005.

See also
List of dams in Japan

References

Dams in Kōchi Prefecture